Lake Maumelle is a man-made lake in central Arkansas, United States, in Pulaski County, and covers 8,900 acres.  It is one of the primary drinking water sources for Little Rock, Arkansas.  It is locally popular for boating and fishing.

The lake was created in the late 1950s, with construction beginning in 1956 to dam the Big Maumelle River, and water flowing into the system in 1958.

See also

List of lakes in Arkansas

References

External links
 Lake Maumelle at Arkansas.com

Buildings and structures in Pulaski County, Arkansas
Maumelle
Maumelle